Live at Rockpalast is a two-disc live album by Welsh musician John Cale. It was released in October 2010 on German record label Made in Germany. It was recorded during his two shows for German music television show Rockpalast on 14 October 1984 at Grugahalle, Essen (first disc; with full band) and 6 March 1983 at Zeche, Bochum (second disc; Cale solo with guitar and piano). This concert is missing "Risé, Sam and Rimsky-Korsakov" (Cale, Shepard) narrated by his then-wife Risé Irushalmi.

Track listing
All tracks composed by John Cale; except where indicated

Disc 1
"Autobiography" − 4:39
"Oh La La" (Cale, Larry Sloman) − 2:38
"Evidence" − 3:24
"Magazines" (Cale, David Young) − 3:36
"Model Beirut Recital" (Cale, Young) − 3:29
"Streets of Laredo" (traditional) − 2:40
"Dr. Mudd" − 3:46
"Leaving It Up to You" − 5:43
"Caribbean Sunset" (Cale, Sloman) − 4:40
"The Hunt“ (Cale, Young) − 3:45
"Fear Is a Man's Best Friend" − 3:44
"Heartbreak Hotel" (Mae Boren Axton, Tommy Durden, Elvis Presley) − 4:01
"Paris 1919" − 3:49
"Waiting for the Man" (Lou Reed) − 6:09
"Mercenaries (Ready for War)" − 9:13
"Pablo Picasso" / "Love Me Two Times" (Jonathan Richman / Jim Morrison, Robby Krieger, Ray Manzarek, John Densmore) − 9:03
"Close Watch" − 2:38

Disc 2
"Ghost Story" − 2:47
"Ship of Fools" − 2:55
"Leaving It Up to You" − 3:58
"Amsterdam" − 2:49
"Child's Christmas in Wales" − 4:03
"Buffalo Ballet" − 2:57
"Antarctica Starts Here" − 2:36
"Taking It All Away" − 2:41
"Riverbank" − 3:36
"Paris 1919" − 3:54
"Guts" − 3:06
"Chinese Envoy" − 3:38
"Thoughtless Kind" − 2:14
"Only Time Will Tell" − 2:22
"Cable Hogue" − 3:37
"Dead or Alive" − 3:17
"Waiting for the Man" (Reed) − 4:46
"Heartbreak Hotel" (Axton, Durden, Presley) − 4:41
"Chorale" − 2:49
"Fear Is a Man's Best Friend" − 3:53
"Close Watch" − 2:50
"Streets of Laredo" (traditional) − 2:25

Personnel
 John Cale − vocals, guitars, piano
 David Lichtenstein − drums (first disc only)
 Andy Heermans − bass guitar (first disc only)
 David Young − guitars (first disc only)

Technical
 Winfried Pannen - sound engineer
 Helmut "Hoppi" Hoppenstedt - remix, mastering
 Peter Rüchel - Executive Producer

References

John Cale live albums
2010 live albums
Albums produced by John Cale